The House of Morosini was a powerful Venetian noble family that gave many doges, statesmen, generals, and admirals to the Republic of Venice, as well as cardinals to the Church.

History 
One legend says the family reached the Venetian lagoon in order to escape the invasion of Attila in northern Italy, and another source places the family’s origin namely in the city of Mantua. It first became prominent at the time of the emperor Otto II, 973–983, owing to its rivalry with the Caloprini family, which it subjugated by the end of the 10th century.

Notable members 
 Blessed Giovanni Morosini ( –1012†), founder in 982 and first abbot of the Benedictine Monastery San Giorgio Maggiore on the island of the same name in Venice, Italy.
 Domenico Morosini (died 1156), elected doge of Venice in 1148, waged war with success against the Dalmatian corsairs, recapturing Pola and other Istrian towns from them.
 Tomasina Morosini (c. 1250-1300), mother of King Andrew III of Hungary. Her brother's granddaughter,  Constanza, was married to King Stefan Vladislav II of Syrmia.
 Marino Morosini (1181–1252) was elected doge in 1249.

 Michele Morosini (1308–1382) was doge from June 1382 until his death in October of the same year.
 Antonio Morosini (c.1360-1433) wrote a very long chronicle ('The Morosini Codex') which recorded events in Venice and elsewhere during the first third of the 15th century. 
 Aliodea Morosini (d. 1478), was dogaressa of Venice.
Giovan Francesco Morosini  (1537-1596) was a cardinal, Bishop of Brescia and Apostolic Nuncio in France.  Son of Pietro Morosini and Cornelia Cornaro, nephew of Cardinal Luigi Cornaro and Cardinal Federico Cornaro.

 Morosina Morosini-Grimani (1545–1614), dogaressa of Venice by marriage to Doge Marino Grimani
 Andrea Morosini (1558–1618) was a famous historian and was entrusted by the Venetian senate with the task of continuing Paolo Paruta's Annali Veneti, in Latin. His history of Venice was published by his brother in 1623, and translated into Italian by Senator Girolamo Melin (Venice, 1782). Among his other works are: Le Imprese ed espeditioni di terra santa, &c. (Venice, 1627); Deus quae Veneta respublica ad Istriae oras gessit, &c. (in the Corner-Duodo collection of MSS.); De forma reipublicae Venetae in MS. in the Bibliothèque Nationale in Paris. His life has been written by Luigi Lollin (1623), by Niccolo Crasso (1621), and by Antonio Palazzoli (1620).

 Giovan Francesco Morosini (1604–1678) was Patriarch of Venice from 1644 to his death.
 Francesco Morosini (1618–1694) was a prominent Venetian sea captain of his time. As a young man, he fought against the Ottoman Turks and the pirates, and after signally distinguishing himself at the Battle of Naxos in 1650, he was appointed commander-in-chief of the Venetian navy. He then conducted a series of successful campaigns against the Turks, but was recalled in consequence of the intrigues of his rival the provveditore Antonio Barbaro (1661). But when Candia was attacked by a large force under the fierce Grand Vizier Köprülü, Morosini was sent to relieve the fortress in 1667; the siege lasted eighteen months, but Morosini, in spite of his prodigies of valor, was forced to surrender to save the surviving inhabitants. He was tried, but acquitted of all blame, and on the renewal of the war with the Turkish Empire in 1684, he was again appointed commander-in-chief, and after several brilliant victories, he reconquered the Peloponnese and Athens. During the siege of Athens, shells from Morosini's bombardment irreparably damaged the Parthenon. Upon his return to Venice, he was loaded with honors and given the title of Peloponnesiaco. In 1688, he was elected doge, and in 1693 he took command of the Venetian forces against the Turks for the fourth time; the enemy which had been cruising in the Aegean archipelago withdrew at his approach, so great was the terror inspired by his name. While wintering at Napoli di Romania (Nauplia), he died on 6 January 1694.

 Sergio Rossetti Morosini (1953–    ), Brazilian  author, painter, sculptor, and independent filmmaker who lives and works in New York City. He sculpted the bust of Michelangelo on the façade of the National Arts Club in New York City. He was also the first to observe that in 1511, Titian described the volume in a two-dimensional fresco painting, Miracle of the Jealous Husband, in the :it:Scuola del Santo, Padua, Italy, by actually sculpting it in relief rather than describing it illusionistically.

See also
 Morosini Fountain, Heraklion
 Oratorio di Sant'Angelo degli Zoppi

References

 

de:Morosini
fr:Morosini